The Geomagnetic Field Monitoring Program, is a scientific mission of the Space and Upper Atmosphere Research Commission of Pakistan (SUPARCO) to undertake research in geophysics, particularly geomagnetism.  The objective of the mission is to provide better understanding of the Earth's magnetic field, and of associated hazard mitigation.  The program monitors mathematical variation in the South Asian regional geomagnetic field. Research is conducted in specially established geomagnetic observatories in Islamabad and Karachi.  Data collected provides the basis for continuous studies of Earth's magnetic field, and is made available to various national and international institutions. 

The program was established in 1983 at the Sonmiani space facility.  The second geomagnetic observatory was established in 2008.  Suparco regularly releases a public domain bulletin of geomagnetic data to national and international users,   containing research on the effects of solar flares and severe magnetic storms recorded by the observatories.

References

External links

Geomagnetism
SUPARCO missions
Missions to the Sun